Andreas Schulz, (born 3 March 1955) is a German co-driver who won, as navigator, two editions of Rally Dakar (cars). He is a member of the X-raid team.

Rally Dakar

References

External links
 Co-driver profile at X-raid

1948 births
German rally co-drivers
Dakar Rally co-drivers
Living people